Wreck Beach (Squamish: Ts'at'lhm) is a clothing-optional beach located in Pacific Spirit Regional Park, which is in turn part of the University Endowment Lands just west of Vancouver, British Columbia, Canada. The park is administered by the Greater Vancouver Regional District (GVRD), though Indigenous claims are repeatedly asserted, especially by the Musqueam.

Acadia Beach – Tower Beach – Point Grey 

The shoreline throughout these beaches is mainly rocky with some sandy stretches with fewer beach-goers. An area is provided for owners to have their dogs off leash. During the smelt season, naturists share this area with nude fishers and their families. Smelt fishing is typically prohibited from the middle of June to the middle of August.

Acadia Beach is short walk down a gentle slope from the parking lot on Marine Drive where there is a grassy area with several picnic tables. Tower Beach is at the end of the much longer Trail 3 and Point Grey is near the steeper Trail 4. There is pay parking close to Trail 3 and 4 at the Museum of Anthropology. All of Wreck Beach is contiguous and it is possible to walk along the entire coastline. However, when the tide is too high, access can be limited.

Along Tower Beach are two tall concrete range/direction instrument towers that are relics from World War II.

Along with lush vegetation, various forms of wildlife can also be seen, including nesting herons, sea lions, kingfishers, and bald eagles.

Wreck Beach proper and Trail 6 

While the entire 7 km beach around to Point Grey from Acadia Beach to Booming Ground Creek is often referred to as Wreck Beach, the large sandy area on the north side of the North Arm Breakwater at the base of Trail 6 is what many think of when they talk about Wreck Beach. The trail is the most developed of the trails down the bluff and has about 500 wooden steps set into the soil. At the bottom of Trail 6 is the most popular portion of the beach, a stretch of sand between two artificial rock jetties constructed as breakwaters, lined by a row of licensed vendors selling imported clothing, jewelry, drinks, snacks, and other beach related items. Other unlicensed vendors may be found wandering the beach selling alcoholic beverages and other more illicit cash crops of British Columbia.

Clothing is optional throughout Wreck Beach. Due to Wreck Beach's proximity to the University of British Columbia, many students and some faculty and staff visit the beach. In recent years many beach users have objected, on both privacy and environmental grounds, to the University's plans to construct new buildings close to the cliff edge and partially overlooking the beach.

Swimming and ocean water quality 

Swimming is popular at Wreck Beach, primarily as brief "dips" for beachgoers to cool off. Since the ocean water is quite cold, swimming far from shore without a wetsuit and partner is not advised. Ocean waves in the summer, when present, are quite small and usually do not pose a risk to swimmers or waders. Rip currents are not known to be a problem and advisories are not usually posted. Caution should be taken when diving or jumping into the water to avoid any submerged rocks. Adverse interactions with marine wildlife or flora are unlikely, but jellyfish should be avoided as a precautionary measure. Small pleasure boats may anchor close to the beach and swimmers should avoid potential collisions with them.

A few times over the years, Metro Vancouver health authorities have issued advisories that the ocean's coliform bacteria counts near the beach are relatively high, and there may be potential risk to swimmers. However, Wreck Beach tends to have lower counts than many Vancouver beaches and gastrointestinal illness is generally unlikely.

Access 

Wreck Beach adjoins the University of British Columbia (UBC) campus, west of the city limits of Vancouver.  It is accessible by road, water, and public buses.  The most popular part of the beach, at the bottom of Trail 6, is about 12 km by road from downtown Vancouver and a short but steep walk from the University.

TransLink runs a number of bus routes (C20, 4, 9, 14, 25, 33, 41, 43, 44, 49, 84, 99, 258, and 480) to the UBC bus loop. From there it is a five-minute walk west, down University Boulevard, to UBC Gate 6 (from which Trail 6 takes its name). Turn right on N.W. Marine Drive and the trail is immediately to the left about 100 meters.

The C20 bus goes by Trail 6 entrance, and there is a stop at University Boulevard and North West Marine Drive.

From Highway 99, turn west on one of these roads:  S.W. Marine Drive, 41st Avenue (which eventually merges onto S.W. Marine Drive) or 16th Avenue (which eventually ends at S.W. Marine Drive, then turn right). Alternatively, from the north only, take the 4th Avenue exit off the Granville Street Bridge (then from 4th Avenue, turn right on N.W. Marine Drive).

From Highway 1, take the Grandview Highway exit (28A) westbound (this eventually becomes 12th Avenue), turn right (north) on Clark Drive, left again (west) on 6th Avenue (this eventually becomes 4th Avenue), and then turn right on N.W. Marine Drive.

Wreck Beach lies at the base of a cliff; therefore the trails are fairly steep. Trail 6 and Trail 7 both have stairs. Trail 6 includes about 500 wooden steps and is the better developed of the two trails. The path from the Acadia Beach parking lot is the most gentle slope and provides the easiest access to a clothing-optional area. When the tide is not too high, it is possible to walk along the entire shore:  from Acadia Beach past the base of Trail 7. Erosion can make the route south of Trail 6 a bit tricky, and it can often be quite muddy.

Parking 

There is a small parking lot at Acadia Beach, a pay parking lot south of Trail 6 and several pay parking lots on the UBC campus. Free parking is also allowed all along the east side of S.W. Marine Drive (opposite the cliff side) and along Old Marine Drive. Illegally parked vehicles are often towed away.

Toilets 

The GVRD provides limited sanitary facilities. There are outhouses by the Acadia Beach parking lot and at the tops of Trails 6 and 7 and at the base of Trail 6. There is no running water, so many visitors bring their own.

See also

Clothes free organizations
List of public outdoor clothes free places
Naturism
Nudism
Public nudity

References

Further reading
 Carellin Brooks, Wreck Beach (book), Number 16 in the Transmontanus series from New Star Books, Vancouver, British Columbia, Canada; www.NewStarBooks.com.  Issued 2007 August. ;  Number 16.

External links 
Pacific Spirit Regional Park
Wreck Beach Preservation Society
Wreck Beach Butoh Art Film

Beaches of Vancouver
Nude beaches
University Endowment Lands